Niasoma is a genus of moths belonging to the subfamily Tortricinae of the family Tortricidae.

Species
Niasoma metallicana (Walsingham, 1895)

See also
List of Tortricidae genera

References

External links
tortricidae.com

Sparganothini
Tortricidae genera